The River Alwin is a short, steep upland river that drains the Kidland Forest on the southern flanks of the Cheviot Hills, in the Northumberland National Park, England.

Course
Rising as the Outer Sike at the edge of the Kidland Forest between the peaks of Yarnspath Law and Bloodybush edge. It flows south through the forest gaining various burns and cloughs, to become the White Burn, until it reaches the confluence of the Yoke Burn, where it forms the River Alwin to the north of Kidlandlee.

From this point the river flows south to collect the Allerhope Burn at the edge of the forest, continuing through a steep sided valley before reaching Clennell Hall. It then passes to the south of Alwinton, finally reaching the hamlet of Low Alwinton where it joins the Coquet.

Hydrology
Between 1969 and 1983 the flow of the Alwin, was measured in its lower reaches at a weir near Clennel.

Land use is mostly forest with more than half of the catchment consisting of woodland, the remainder is grassland and moorland.

The River Alwin has been classed as having good ecological quality under the Water Framework Directive. This is one of the upper bands in the five part framework scale, which ranges from high, good, and moderate, through to poor and finally bad.

See also
List of rivers of England

References

External links

Alwin